Laminacauda monticola is a species of sheet weaver found in Bolivia. It was described by Millidge in 1985.

References

Linyphiidae
Spiders described in 1985
Endemic fauna of Bolivia
Spiders of South America